Jakupović  is a Bosnian surname. Notable people with the surname include:

 Arnel Jakupović (born 1998), Austrian footballer 
 Dalila Jakupović (born 1991), Slovenian tennis player of Bosnian descent
 Eldin Jakupović (born 1984), Swiss-Bosnian footballer
 Alexandros Jakupovic (born 1981), Greek former tennis player of Greek and Bosnian descent

Bosnian surnames
Patronymic surnames
Surnames from given names